Giselda Lombardi, better known by her screen name Leda Gys (March 10, 1892 – October 2, 1957), was an Italian film actress of the silent era. The poet Carlo Alberto Salustri gave the aspiring actress her new name and introduced her to the film business in 1913. Her breakthrough role came in the epic Christus, which was shot in Palestine and Egypt. She then married the producer Gustavo Lombardo and worked for his Naples-based Lombardo Films, generally appearing in comedies that were often directed by Eugenio Perego.

Selected filmography
 Pierrot the Prodigal (1914)
 The Wedding March (1915)
 Christus (1916)
 Naples is a Song (1927)

References

Bibliography
 Abel, Richard. Encyclopedia of Early Cinema. Taylor & Francis, 2005.

External links

1892 births
1957 deaths
Italian film actresses
Italian silent film actresses
20th-century Italian actresses
Actresses from Rome